Aristide Sartor (28 July 1923 – 8 November 1979) was a French rower. He competed in the men's coxed pair event at the 1948 Summer Olympics.

He was the brother of fellow rower Ampelio Sartor.

References

External links
 

1923 births
1979 deaths
French male rowers
Olympic rowers of France
Rowers at the 1948 Summer Olympics
People from Montebelluna
Sportspeople from the Province of Treviso
Italian emigrants to France